The Robert Langdon franchise consists of American action-adventure mystery-thriller installments, including three theatrical films directed by Ron Howard, and a television series. The films, based on the novel series written by Dan Brown, center on the fictional character of Robert Langdon. Though based on the book series, the films have a different chronological order, consisting of: The Da Vinci Code (2006), Angels & Demons (2009) and Inferno (2016). Despite mixed-to-negative critical reception, the films are considered box office successes, having a combined gross total of $1.5 billion worldwide. 

The television series, a contemporary-prequel titled The Lost Symbol (2021), explores the early years of Langdon's career.

Development
Dan Brown's novels about Professor Robert Langdon: Angels & Demons (2000), The Da Vinci Code (2003) and Inferno (2013), quickly became international bestsellers; they were soon adapted into films by Columbia Pictures with Ron Howard directing and producing.

Films

Television

The Lost Symbol

Following the worldwide successes of the first two films, Columbia Pictures began development on a film adaptation of The Lost Symbol. Hanks and Howard were scheduled to return as star and director, with Brian Grazer and John Calley as producers, while a script was collectively co-written by Steven Knight, original author Dan Brown, and Danny Strong. By January 2013, the final draft of the script was near completion, with pre-production expected to start later that year. However, in July Sony Pictures announced they would adapt Inferno as the next film instead.

In June 2019, the project was announced to be re-conceived as a television series tentatively titled Langdon. The series serves as a prequel to the film series, with Daniel Cerone serving as creator, showrunner, chief executive producer, and screenwriter. Dan Brown, Ron Howard, Brian Grazer, Francie Calfo, Samie Falvey and Anna Culp will act as additional executive producers. The show will be a co-production between Imagine Television Studios, CBS Television Studios, and Universal Television Studios and was ordered to series on NBC.

The plot revolves around a young Robert Langdon, who is hired by the CIA to solve a number of deadly puzzles when his mentor goes missing. By March 2020, Ashley Zukerman had been cast in the lead role. Later that month it was announced that the production had been given a series order and would be moving to Peacock. The show premiered on September 16, 2021, concluded on November 18, 2021, and was officially canceled after one season on January 24, 2022.

Cast and characters

Additional crew and production details

Reception

Box office performance

Critical and public response

References

External links

Columbia Pictures franchises
Films based on works by Dan Brown
Film series introduced in 2006
Horror film franchises